Piaçabuçu Environmental Protection Area is a protected coastal area  in the state of Alagoas, Brazil.

Location

It is administered by the Chico Mendes Institute for Biodiversity Conservation.
It covers all or part of the municipalities of Feliz Deserto and Piaçabuçu in the state of Alagoas.
The people of the area live by fishing, either by line or trawling with motorized boats.

Conservation

The environmental conservation area is classed as IUCN protected area category V, protected landscape/seascape.
The purpose is to protect biological diversity, control human occupation and ensure the sustainable use of natural resources.
Specific goals are to protect marine turtles and seabirds, and to stabilize the dunes.
Protected species include the olive ridley sea turtle (Lepidochelys olivacea).

Notes

Sources

Environmental protection areas of Brazil
Protected areas of Alagoas